The 2011 Torneio Touchdown was the third season since the league's foundation.

Teams in 2011

References 

American football in Brazil
Torneio Touchdown
Torneio Touchdown